Pranas Končius code name Adomas (born in 1911 in Bargaliai, Kretinga district) was the last anti-Soviet Lithuanian partisan killed in action. He was shot by MVD forces on July 6, 1965 (or according to other sources shot himself in order not to be captured on July 13). There still were remaining anti-Soviet partisans, who legalised themselves later or lived illegally for decades to come.

Before World War II, Končius served in the Lithuanian Army. He also participated in the anti-Soviet June Uprising in 1941. In 2000 he was posthumously awarded the Cross of Vytis. In September 2015 president of Lithuania Dalia Grybauskaitė signed a decree which took away the award due to being involved in the Holocaust.

References

External links
 Short biography with further reference
 Kardas unit biography

1911 births
1965 deaths
People from Kretinga District Municipality
People from Kovno Governorate
Lithuanian partisans
Deaths by firearm in Lithuania
Guerrillas killed in action
Recipients of the Order of the Cross of Vytis
Soviet dissidents
People shot dead by law enforcement officers
Deaths by firearm in the Soviet Union

Holocaust perpetrators in Lithuania